Daniele is a given name.

Daniele may also refer to:

Daniele (surname), an Italian surname
Daniele, Inc., an American food manufacturing company
Daniele, Greater Poland Voivodeship, a village in Szamotuły County, Greater Poland Voivodeship, Poland

See also
Daniel (disambiguation)